A cryptographic -multilinear map is a kind of multilinear map, that is, a function  such that for any integers  and elements , , and which in addition is efficiently computable and satisfies some security properties. It has several applications on cryptography, as key exchange protocols, identity-based encryption, and broadcast encryption. There exist constructions of cryptographic 2-multilinear maps, known as bilinear maps, however, the problem of constructing such multilinear maps for  seems much more difficult   and the security of the proposed candidates is still unclear.

Definition

For n = 2 
In this case, multilinear maps are mostly known as bilinear maps or pairings, and they are usually defined as follows:    Let  be two additive cyclic groups of prime order , and  another cyclic group of order  written multiplicatively. A pairing is a map: ,  which satisfies the following properties:
 Bilinearity 
 Computability There exists an efficient algorithm to compute .

General case (for any n) 
We say that a map  is a -multilinear map if it satisfies the following properties:
 There exists an efficient algorithm to compute .

Candidates 
All the candidates multilinear maps are actually slightly generalizations of multilinear maps known as graded-encoding systems, since they allow the map  to be applied partially: instead of being applied in all the  values at once, which would produce a value in the target set , it is possible to apply  to some values, which generates values in intermediate target sets.

The three main candidates are GGH13, which is based on ideals of polynomial rings; CLT13, which is based approximate GCD problem and works over integers, hence, it is supposed to be easier to understand than GGH13 multilinear map; and GGH15, which is based on graphs.

References

Cryptography
Multilinear algebra